Córka generała Pankratowa  (The General Pankratov's Daughter)  is a Polish historical film. It was released in 1934.

Cast 

 Nora Ney - Aniuta
 Franciszek Brodniewicz - Bolesław
 Kazimierz Junosza-Stępowski - general Pankratov
 Stanisław Grolicki - general-governor
 Aleksander Żabczyński - adjutant
 Mieczysław Cybulski - Alexey Voronov
 Zofia Lindorfówna - revolutionary
 Jerzy Leszczyński - count Bobrov
 Maria Bogda - revolutionary
 Zbigniew Ziembiński - revolutionary
 Stanisław Daniłłowicz - informant
 Helena Buczyńska - Aniuta's aunt
 Stanisława Perzanowska - owner of the apartment
 Zygmunt Chmielewski
 Stefania Górska
 Wanda Jarszewska
 Alina Żeliska
 Romuald Gierasieński
 Feliks Żukowski
 Zofia Terné
 Zofia Kajzerówna
 Ryszard Kierczyński
 Tadeusz Fijewski
 Henryk Rzętkowski
 Monica Carlo
 Rufin Morozowicz

References

External links
 

1934 films
Polish historical films
1930s Polish-language films
Polish black-and-white films
1930s historical films